1925 Korvpalli Meistriliiga was the inaugural season of the Estonian basketball league.

The season started on 15 March 1925 and concluded on 28 March 1925 with Tallinna Sport winning their 1st Estonian League title.

Teams

Fixtures and results

References

External links
Official website 

Korvpalli Meistriliiga seasons
1925 in basketball
1925 in Estonian sport